Deborah Sanderson is an American politician who has served in the Maine House of Representatives from 2010 to 2018.

References

Living people
Republican Party members of the Maine House of Representatives
Year of birth missing (living people)
Women state legislators in Maine
People from Kennebec County, Maine
21st-century American women